Manish (マニッシュ Manisshu) were a Japanese power-pop band formed in 1992 by vocalist and lyricist, Misuzu Takahashi and composer and keyboardist, Mari Nishimoto. The band's name comes from spelling member name MA(ri)NISH(imoto). Manish disbanded in 1998.

Biography
In early 1992, Misuzu and Mari were part of the Japanese idol group "DALI" who debuted with their only single "Moonlight Densetsu", which was used as opening theme for anime television series Sailor Moon. Soon after release of the single, the group disbanded.

During the same year in December, Misuzu and Mari formed the band and debuted with single Koibito to Sakebenai. Their second single, Koe ni Naranaihodo ni Itoshii was written by vocalist and lyricist of Japanese rock band Wands, Uesugi Show which he later self-covered in their studio album Little Bit. This became one of their earlier hits and first single awarded by RIAJ with Golden Disk.

Sunao no Mama ni Kiss Shiyou was written by popular singer-songwriter Maki Ohguro, who later wrote several other songs and participated in recording production as a backing vocalist. Some fans refer to them as the "female version" of Japanese hard-rock band B'z due to their similar power-pop melody in theirs songs and having same musical producer, Masao Akashi.

In 1995, their single Kirameku Toki ni Torawarete was used as third ending theme for the anime television series Slam Dunk. The single has been awarded by RIAJ with platinum disk.

As one of the rare Being Inc. artist, they've made multiple media appearances on Music Station.

In 1998 after releasing their compilation album Manish Best -Escalation-, they disbanded. In 2002, during the release of "complete at the being studio" compilation album series, the album includes two unreleased songs from their career which were exclusively added in the album. According to the liner notes, the songs were previously recorded during production of their second studio album Individual.

Some of their music videoclips were released in 2012 at 2-disc DVD set Legend of 90's J-Rock Best Live & Clips.

In November 2003 an article by Nikkei Entertainment! reported that the duo was no longer associated with the entertainment industry and are now happy focusing on their own things. (https://ja.wikipedia.org/wiki/MANISH)

Members
Misuzu Takahashi (高橋美鈴) (BOD: February 19th, 1974) - vocalist, lyricist
Mari Nishimoto (西本麻里) (BOD: February 9th 1973) - keyboardist, composer, backing-vocals

Discography
During their career they have released three studio, one compilation albums and twelve singles.

Studio albums

Manish (1993)
Individual (1994)
Cheer! (1996)

Compilation albums
Manish Best -Escalation (1998)
complete "Manish" at the Being Studio (2002)
Best of Best 1000 Manish (2007)

Singles

Koibito to Sakebenai (1992)
Koe ni Naranaihodo Itoshii (1993)
Sunao no Mama ni Kiss shiyou (1993)
Kimi ga Hoshii Zenbu ga Hoshii (1993)
Nemuranai Machi ni Nagasarete (1994)
Dakedo Tomerarenai (1994)
Mou Dare no Me wo Kinishinai (1994)
Ashite he no Story (1994)
Hashiridase Lonely Night (1994)
Kirameku Toki ni Torawarete (1995)
Kono Isshun to Iu Eien no Nakade (1995)
Kimi no Sora ni Naritai (1996)

RIAJ Certifications
Koe ni Naranaihodo Itoshii: Golden Disk
Manish (album): Golden Disk
Mou Daremo Me wo Kinishinai: Golden Disk
Individual: Golden Disk
Kirameku Toki ni Torawarete: Golden Disk, Platinum Disk

Magazine appearances
From Music Freak Magazine:
Vol.03: 1995/February
Vol.15: 1996/February
Vol.21: 1996/August
Vol.28: 1997/March
Vol.47: 1998/October

References

External links
Official Site
Old Official Website (WebArchived)
Musicbrainz
Discogs

Japanese pop music groups
Being Inc. artists
Musical groups established in 1992
Musical groups disestablished in 1998